Theisoa constrictella is a moth of the family Gelechiidae. It was described by Zeller in 1873. It is found in North America, where it has been recorded from Texas to Florida, north to Maryland and Kentucky.

The larvae feed on Ulmus species.

References

Moths described in 1873
Anomologini